AIT Austrian Institute of Technology is Austria's largest Research and Technology Organization (RTO), employing about 1,300 people mostly based at the main facilities Vienna Tech Gate, Vienna TECHbase, Seibersdorf, Wiener Neustadt, Ranshofen and Graz.

In June 2009 the name was changed from Austrian Research Centers (ARC) to AIT Austrian Institute of Technology GmbH.

It is owned by the Republic of Austria (through the Ministry of Transport with 50.46% and by the Federation of Austrian Industries with 49.54%).

The managing directors are Anton Plimon and Wolfgang Knoll.

Organization

Centers

The company is structured in eight Centers:
 Energy
 Health & Bioresources
 Digital Safety & Security
 Vision, Automation & Control
 Mobility Systems
 Low-Emission Transport
 Technology Experience
 Innovation Systems & Policy

Subsidiaries

AIT has the following wholly owned subsidiaries:
 Seibersdorf Labor GmbH
 Nuclear Engineering Seibersdorf GmbH
 Leichtmetallkompetenzzentrum Ranshofen GmbH - LKR

See also
ASTRA (reactor)

External links
https://www.ait.ac.at/

Research institutes in Austria